Ilam is a Kurdish city and capital of Ilam Province, Iran. At the 2011 census, its population was 213,579 people, and 52,474 families. The Kabir Kuh mountain range lies east of the city. From the west it borders Iraq.

Demographics 
Language composition:

Architecture
Like many other regions of Iran the architecture in Ilam includes traditional and contemporary periods. Although easy access to fossil fuels and electricity may have aided the transition in Iranian architecture in other regions of Iran from its traditional to modern styles, in Ilam the increasing population has also played a role.

The Governor Castle, Falahaty Mansion and The Mirgholam Castle are examples of some surviving traditional buildings in Ilam. The courtyard dwelling is the main type of the buildings of this period. This type of building was accepted as the main building type over all Iran for both climatic and cultural reasons. Brick is the main constructional material in these buildings. The passive thermal techniques indicated for the Iranian traditional buildings are commonly used in these buildings.

The Governor Castle of Ilam was built in type of courtyard. Adding shade and moisture by using green landscape, high trees and a pond, were the main passive techniques used in this building to reduce the temperature in summer.
The Mirgholam Castle of Ilam presents a classic Iranian courtyard. The garden and the pound were the main elements of this type of buildings. The Falahaty Mansion used a pitched roof as it was regular beside the flat roofs in the traditional buildings in Ilam earlier.

Climate
It is located in the west of Iran at a latitude of 33° 38´ north and longitude of 46° 26´ east. Although this city is surrounded by mountains, its climate is also affected by deserts from the west and the south. This region presents a highly variable annual weather profile. Heavy showers or snow in the winter and dusty, brutally hot, dry weather in the summer are normal for this region.

Ilam's climate is classed under the Köppen climate classification as a Mediterranean climate (Csa) with continental influences.

Colleges and universities
Ilam contains the following universities:
 Ilam University of Medical Sciences
 University of Ilam
 Islamic Azad University of Ilam
 Safir Danesh
 Farhangian University, Shahid Modares Campus of Ilam (Men) and Imam Jafar -e- Sadiqh Campus of Ilam (Women)

See also
Eyvan

References

External links 

 Farshid Sāmāni, Ilam, the Sleeping Beauty, in Persian, Jadid Online, 26 May 2009: .• Discovering Ilam, in English, Jadid Online, 22 October 2009, .• Photo gallery, containing 25 photographs with informative captions in English: .

Populated places in Ilam County
Cities in Ilam Province
Iranian provincial capitals
Kurdish settlements in Ilam Province